Sarawak General Hospital (Malay: Hospital Umum Sarawak) is the largest general hospital in the state of Sarawak, Malaysia. It is one out of two main tertiary and referral hospitals in East Malaysia (the other being Queen Elizabeth Hospital, Kota Kinabalu, Sabah). In its earlier years, it was known as Kuching General Hospital.

History

Sarawak General Hospital has been in existence since 1870. However, no proper historical records have been preserved of its existence.

The earliest record about the hospital is from 1910. Based from this documentation, the hospital was initially located at the current site of the Kuching Central Prison (later renamed into "Pavilion Building" and converted to Sarawak Textile Museum in 2000) and a total of 920 patients were admitted to the hospital during that year.

In 1925, construction of a new hospital started at Jalan Tun Abang Haji Openg. The new hospital was operational from 1931. From its foundation up until at least the outbreak of World War II, the hospital was known as Kuching General Hospital.

After World War II, the hospital was unable to meet the growing needs of the population. In 1957, a proposal to build a new and modern hospital was put forward. A total of RM13.5 million was spent for the 1964 - 1968 Development Plan and the consultation and management fees amounting to RM8.2 million was paid for by the Australian Government under the Colombo Plan.

The construction of the hospital was planned in 2 phases. Phase I involved the building of an 8-story Main Block, including the Emergency Unit. Phase I construction began in 1965 and was completed in May 1970. By then, the cost of construction grew to RM17.8 million. The lion's share of the cost amounting RM17.3 million was borne by the federal government while the rest was paid by the state government.

Phase II involved the completion of an extra floor in the east wing and an additional five stories in the western part of the Main Block. Phase II construction began in September 1970 and was completed in 1972.

The new hospital then was able to accommodate 582 patients and had many modern facilities.

The subsequent years, many additions were made to the hospital, including:
 1977 - Houseman quarters A
 1978 - New mortuary
 1980 - Laboratory block
 1988 - Renovation of the Pharmacy Department
 1993 - Construction of the Specialist Clinic block
 1994 - Houseman Quarters B
 2000 - Clinical Block and Inpatient Block completed
 2009 - Main tower block refurbishment completed
 2009 - Houseman quarters A conversion to Isolation Ward for infectious disease completed

The main block of the hospital underwent renovation and refurbishment, which was completed in September 2009. SGH currently has 1005 beds and is on par with other hospitals in Malaysia and Asia.

Specialisations and services
SGH offers many specialisations and it serves as a referral centre for East Malaysia.

Chronology of some units formed:
 1985 – Department of Radiotherapy and Oncology was operational
 1987- Physiotherapy Unit
 1987 - Haemodialysis unit was formed
In Medicine, prior to 1987 there was only the department of general medicine with 3 general physicians. In August of that year Dr Chew Peng Hong was transferred to head the dept. of medicine of the hospital & by the time he retired in 2003' he had set up the following subspecialties in Medicine: nephrology, dermatology, neurology, rheumatology, chest medicine, cardiology, infectious diseases.gastro-enterology, haematology besides playing a major & key role in helping plan a brand new medical school, The School Of Medicine & Health Sciences of the University of Malaysia, Sarawak, which uses SGH as its teaching hospital. For his contribution the University appointed him adjunct Professor of Medicine till to date. In 2006 the Federal Government recognised his selfless contribution to medicine in Sarawak in particular & Malaysia in general conferred on him by the Agong ( the Malaysian King)  the honorific of PJN which carries the title of Datuk. During his tenure Dr Chew had managed to get the department to achieve international standards for which he received numerous awards from the State Government of Sarawak, the Federal Government & the ministry of health.

Teaching hospital
SGH serves as a teaching hospital for a wide field of medical and allied health personnel. The medical faculty of Universiti Malaysia Sarawak uses the hospital as a teaching hospital for its medical students.

SGH is also a popular place for elective attachment for medical students. Elective students from UK, Australia & New Zealand started to come regularly after 1987 when the department of medicine was headed by Dr Chew Peng Hong. Since then it has become a favourite elective destination for British medical students particularly from the London Medical schools, Newcastle, Leeds, Liverpool, Glasgow, Southampton, Hull & York, Peninsular as well as medical schools in Germany & Denmark. Nearer to home students from Australia & New Zealand, Hong Kong  & Japan are coming in increasing numbers in addition to medical schools in Malaysia, both public & private.
Much of the effort making it a popular institution are from the contribution of Dr Wong Jin Shyan ( presently of Borneo Medical Center) & Professor Datuk Dr P.H. Chew, honorary consultant physician to the hospital & adjunct Professor of Medicine of the faculty of medicine & health sciences of the University of Malaysia Sarawak(UNIMAS).

References

External links

 Official Website
 Malaysian Ministry of Health Website

Hospitals in Kuching
Hospital buildings completed in 1931
Hospital buildings completed in 1970
Hospital buildings completed in 1972
Teaching hospitals in Malaysia